Kúttò (Kupto) is a minor West Chadic language of Nigeria.

References

West Chadic languages
Languages of Nigeria